Beriah Melbourne Gwynne Thomas (11 June 1896 – 23 June 1966) was a Welsh international rugby union player. He played club rugby several teams including Nantymoel, Ogmore Vale, Bridgend, St. Batholomew's Hospital, London Welsh and Cardiff. At international level he represented Wales on six occasions.

Rugby career
"Melbourne" Thomas was a Doctor of Medicine, having studied first at University College, Cardiff and then at St Bartholomew's Hospital, he also played rugby for both institutions. During the First World War he enlisted in the Royal Navy, serving as a surgeon sub-lieutenant. After the war came to a close, in an effort to rebuild the sport of rugby, a match was organised between a Wales team and the New Zealand Army. The game was arranged for 21 April 1919, to be played at St. Helen's in Swansea. Thomas was chosen to represent Wales, earning his first international cap.

International games played
Wales
  1924
  1921
  1921, 1923
  New Zealand Army 1919
  1921

Bibliography

References

1896 births
1966 deaths
Alumni of Cardiff University
Alumni of the Medical College of St Bartholomew's Hospital
Barbarian F.C. players
Bridgend RFC players
Cardiff RFC players
People educated at Ysgol Brynteg
Royal Navy personnel of World War I
Rugby union players from Bridgend County Borough
Rugby union wings
Wales international rugby union players
Welsh rugby union players